The Trout is a 1982 French drama film directed by Joseph Losey based on the novel by Roger Vailland and starring Isabelle Huppert. This was the last film that Losey directed to be released in his lifetime, as he died two years after its release.

Plot
Traumatized since her childhood, Frederique - nicknamed the Trout - retaliates against men by seducing them to exploit them without ever giving herself. She marries Galuchat, a homosexual, and lives for a while in Japan with Saint-Genis, a businessman whom she met at the same time as a rich couple, the Ramberts.

Cast
 Isabelle Huppert - Frédérique
 Jean-Pierre Cassel - Rambert
 Jeanne Moreau - Lou
 Daniel Olbrychski - Saint-Genis
 Jacques Spiesser - Galuchat
 Isao Yamagata - Daigo Hamada
 Jean-Paul Roussillon - Verjon
 Roland Bertin - The Count
 Lisette Malidor - Mariline
 Craig Stevens - Carter, Company President
 Ruggero Raimondi - Party Guest
 Alexis Smith - Gloria
 Lucas Belvaux - Clerk
 Pierre Forget - Père de Frédérique
 Ippo Fujikawa - Kumitaro
 Yûko Kada - Akiko (as Yuko Kada)
 Anne François - Air France Stewardess
 Pascal Morand - Lord

See also
 Isabelle Huppert on screen and stage

References

Further reading

External links

1982 films
1982 drama films
1982 LGBT-related films
French drama films
1980s French-language films
Films directed by Joseph Losey
French LGBT-related films
LGBT-related drama films
1980s French films